Roelof Wunderink (born 12 December 1948 in Eindhoven, North Brabant) is a Dutch former racing driver.  He participated in six Formula One World Championship Grands Prix for Ensign, debuting on 27 April 1975.  He scored no championship points.

Racing career
Wunderink began his career with a Simca in 1970 subsequently moving into Formula Ford and winning the Dutch championship in 1972. With sponsorship from the HB alarm company, he moved into Formula Three and then Formula 5000 in the following two seasons. In , with HB backing, he moved into Formula One with the Ensign team, but was hampered by using obsolete machinery and injuries sustained in a Formula 5000 testing incident. In six attempts, he qualified on three occasions retiring from two races with mechanical problems. In his only finish, in Austria, he  was not classified, four laps behind having pit-stopped for tyres. At the end of the season, Wunderink withdrew from top-level motorsport. He was subsequently known to be involved in the property business.

Racing record

Complete European F5000 Championship results
(key) (Races in bold indicate pole position; races in italics indicate fastest lap.)

Complete Formula One World Championship results
(key)

References

External links
Profile at grandprix.com
Roelof Wunderink at oldracingcars.com

1948 births
Living people
Dutch racing drivers
Dutch Formula One drivers
Sportspeople from Eindhoven
Ensign Formula One drivers